George Keys (born 12 December 1959) is a former New Zealand rower who won an Olympic Bronze medal at the 1988 Summer Olympics in Seoul.

Keys was born in 1959 in the Christchurch suburb of Burwood. He was a member of the Avon Rowing Club. At the 1982 World Rowing Championships at Rotsee, Switzerland, he won a gold medal with the New Zealand eight in seat four. At the 1983 World Rowing Championships at Wedau in Duisburg, Germany, he won a gold medal with the New Zealand eight in seat seven. At the 1984 Summer Olympics in Los Angeles Keys competed in the eights which finished fourth. At the 1988 Olympics, he won Bronze in the coxed four along with Ian Wright, Greg Johnston, Chris White and Andrew Bird (cox).

In 1982, the 1982 rowing eight crew was named sportsman of the year. The 1982 team was inducted into the New Zealand Sports Hall of Fame in 1995.

References

External links 
 
 

1959 births
Living people
New Zealand male rowers
Olympic rowers of New Zealand
Olympic bronze medalists for New Zealand
Rowers at the 1984 Summer Olympics
Rowers at the 1988 Summer Olympics
Olympic medalists in rowing
World Rowing Championships medalists for New Zealand
Medalists at the 1988 Summer Olympics
20th-century New Zealand people